Where the Lark Sings (German: Wo die Lerche singt, Hungarian: A pacsirta) is a 1918 operetta by the Hungarian composer Franz Lehár. The work premiered at the Király Theatre in Budapest on 1 January 1918. It was one of Lehár's most successful wartime operettas.

Margit, a young Hungarian country girl travels to a major city where she is seduced and then abandoned by an artist. Eventually she returns home to the countryside "where the larks sing" and is reconciled with her peasant fiancé Pista.

Film adaptation
In 1936 the work was adapted into an operetta film Where the Lark Sings directed by Carl Lamac. It was a co-production between Hungary, Germany and Switzerland.

References
Notes

Sources
 

German-language operettas
1918 operas
Operas
Operas by Franz Lehár